Crab Run is a tributary of Mahanoy Creek in Schuylkill County, Pennsylvania, in the United States. Despite being listed as impaired by abandoned mine drainage, the stream is not impacted by this; no mining has been done in its watershed. However, some stream reaches in its watershed do experience agricultural impacts. The stream is not far from the Western Middle Anthracite Field. Its watershed is designated as a Coldwater Fishery and a Migratory Fishery. As of 2001, the stream contains macroinvertebrates, but no fish.

Course
Crab Run begins in Barry Township, not far from the census-designated place of Beurys Lake. It flows west-northwest for several tenths of a mile and passes through a pond or small lake before turning north-northeast. After several tenths of a mile, the stream receives an unnamed tributary from the left and turns northeast. Several tenths of a mile further downstream, it receives an unnamed tributary from the right and turns north-northwest for a few tenths of a mile, flowing alongside the base of a mountain. The stream then turns north-northeast for a short distance, passing through a pond or small lake before reaching its confluence with Mahanoy Creek.

Hydrology

Some stream reaches in the watershed of Crab Run are not designated as impaired waterbodies. One stream reach is listed as impaired by metals from abandoned mine drainage, but no mining has been done in the watershed. Another stream reach is impaired by siltation/organic enrichment/low dissolved oxygen from agriculture/grazing.

In August 2001, the discharge of Crab Run was measured to be .

Geography and geology
Crab Run is situated some distance to the south of the Western Middle Anthracite Field.

The streambed of Crab Run predominantly features cobbles, but fine silt covers it as well. The Munsell color of the stream's dried sediment is dark yellowish brown.

Watershed
The stream is entirely within the United States Geological Survey quadrangle of Tremont. Its mouth is located within  of the community of Taylorville.

History
Crab Run was entered into the Geographic Names Information System on August 2, 1979. Its identifier in the Geographic Names Information System is 1172575.

A concrete tee beam bridge over Crab Run was built in Taylorville in 1940.

Biology
The drainage basin of Crab Run is designated as a Coldwater Fishery and a Migratory Fishery. In 2001, no fish were observed in Crab Run. However, macroinvertebrates were observed.

In 2001, a total of ten macroinvertebrate taxa were observed in Crab Run. Chironomidae was "very abundant", with more than 100 individuals being observed. Simuliidae and Hydropsychidae were "abundant", with 25 to 100 individuals being observed. Ephemerellidae, Crydalidae, Tipulidae, Cambaridae, and Oligochaeta were "present", with 3 to 9 individuals being observed. The taxa Nemouridae and Heptageniidae were "rare", with 1 to 2 individuals being observed. The family-level Hilsenhoff Biotic Index value of Crab Run in 2001 was 5.61.

See also
 Zerbe Run, next tributary of Mahanoy Creek going downstream
 Little Mahanoy Creek, next tributary of Mahanoy Creek going upstream
 List of rivers of Pennsylvania
 List of tributaries of Mahanoy Creek

References

Rivers of Schuylkill County, Pennsylvania
Tributaries of Mahanoy Creek
Rivers of Pennsylvania